Nature of the Beast may refer to:

The Nature of the Beast (1995 film), an American mystery thriller film
Nature of the Beast (2007 film), a 2007 American romantic comedy television film
The Nature of the Beast (1919 film), a British silent drama film
Dennis Skinner: Nature of the Beast, a 2017 British documentary film
"Nature of the Beast" (NCIS), an episode of the American police procedural drama NCIS
The Nature of the Beast (album), a 1981 album by April Wine
Nature of the Beast (album), a 1985 album by Maureen Steele
The Nature of the Beast, a 1945 book on animal behavior by Ruth Crosby Noble.